Arthur Heyne (born 25 August 1946) is a German rower. He competed in the men's double sculls event at the 1972 Summer Olympics.

References

External links
 

1946 births
Living people
German male rowers
Olympic rowers of West Germany
Rowers at the 1972 Summer Olympics
People from Kaiserslautern
Sportspeople from Rhineland-Palatinate